Novum Instrumentum omne was the first published New Testament in Greek (1516). It was prepared by Desiderius Erasmus (1466–1536) and printed by Johann Froben (1460–1527) of Basel. Although the first printed Greek New Testament was the Complutensian Polyglot (1514), it was the second to be published (1516). Erasmus used several Greek manuscripts housed in Basel, but some  verses in Revelation he translated from the Latin Vulgate.

Five editions of Novum Instrumentum omne were published, although its title was changed to Novum Testamentum omne with the second edition, and the name continued. Erasmus issued editions in 1516, 1519, 1522, 1527, and 1536. Notable amongst these are the second edition (1519), used by Martin Luther for his translation of the New Testament into German (the so-called "September Testament"), and the third edition (1522), which was used by William Tyndale for the first English New Testament (1526) and later by translators of the Geneva Bible and the King James Version. With the third edition, the Comma Johanneum was included. The Erasmian editions, and the 16th century revisions thereof, were the basis for the majority of modern translations of the New Testament in the 16–19th centuries.

First edition 
In 1512 Erasmus had been in negotiation with Badius Ascensius of Paris to publish a new edition of Adagia. It did not happen, and Erasmus did not continue contacts with Badius. 

While some speculate that at that time Erasmus did not think about a Greek New Testament, the historical record demonstrates Erasmus had been inspired back in 1504 by his discovery of Lorenzo Valla’s Adnotationis Novum Testamentum, a work comparing the Latin Vulgate against Greek manuscripts with variant readings noted. Erasmus immediately republished Valla's work in 1505 and wrote in his preface about the need to recover the true text of the Bible. In 1499, encouraged by John Colet of Oxford, Erasmus had already begun an intensive study of the Greek language. Now he began collecting and comparing Greek manuscripts far and wide in order to provide the world with a fresh Latin translation from the Greek. On a visit to Basel in August 1514, he contacted Swiss-German printer Johann Froben of Basel.

Critical Scholar Speculation 
In their own advocacy of the competing Alexandrian text-type and Critical Text against Erasmus' work, modern critical scholars Bruce Metzger and S. P. Tregelles speculated without evidence that Froben might have heard about "the forthcoming Spanish Polyglot Bible," and tried to overtake the project of Cardinal Francisco Jiménez de Cisneros. However, not only had the Complutensian Polyglot New Testament already been printed back in January 1514, months before Erasmus met with Froben in August, but the historical record shows the Pope had issue with some translations in the Polyglot. Translator Antonio de Nebrija quit the Polyglot project when Cardinal Cisneros refused to allow him to alter the translations according to the Pope's satisfaction.  What is clear from the historical record, is that Erasmus was inspired in 1504 by Valla’s work (not Cisneros) to create a new translation from the Greek and his translation would later be met with approval in March 1516.

In July 1515, Erasmus went to Basel and Johannes Oecolampadius served as his editorial assistant and Hebrew consultant. Erasmus borrowed some manuscripts from the Basel Dominican Library. He used seven manuscripts; they were identified:

Manuscripts 1eap and 1rK Erasmus borrowed from Johannes Reuchlin. The rest of the manuscripts he borrowed from Dominicans. It is significant that he did not use the Codex Basilensis, which was held at the Basel University Library, and was available for him. Erasmus had three manuscripts of the Gospels and Acts, four manuscripts of the Pauline epistles, but only one manuscript with the Book of Revelation. In every book of the New Testament he compared three or four manuscripts, except the last book, Revelation. Unfortunately, this manuscript was not complete, as it lacked the final leaf, which contained the last six verses of the book. Instead of delaying the publication, on account of the search for another manuscript, he decided to translate the missing verses from the Latin Vulgate into Greek. He used an inferior Vulgate manuscript with textual variant libro vitae (book of life) instead of ligno vitae (tree of life) in Rev. 22:19. Even in other parts of Revelation and other books of the New Testament, Erasmus occasionally introduced self-created Greek text material taken from the Vulgate. F. H. A. Scrivener remarked that in Rev. 17:4, Erasmus created a new Greek word: ἀκαθάρτητος (instead of τὰ ἀκάθαρτα). There is no such word in the Greek language as ἀκαθάρτητος. In Rev. 17:8 he used καιπερ εστιν (and yet is) instead of και παρεσται (and shall come). In Acts 9:6 the question that Paul asks at the time of his conversion on the Damascus road, Τρέμων τε καὶ θαμβὣν εἲπεν κύριε τί μέ θέλεις ποιῆσαι ("And he trembling and astonished said, Lord, what will you have me to do?") was incorporated from the Vulgate.

The printing began on 2 October 1515, and in very short time was finished (1 March 1516). It was produced quickly – Erasmus declared later that the first edition was "precipitated rather than edited" (praecipitatum verius quam editum) – with numerous typographical errors and was unusually titled:
Novum Instrumentum omne, diligenter ab Erasmo Rot. Recognitum et Emendatum, non solum ad Graecam veritatem verum etiam ad multorum utriusq; linguae codicum eorumq; veterum simul et emendatorum fidem, postremo ad probatissimorum autorum citationem, emendationem et interpretationem, praecipue, Origenis, Chrysostomi, Cyrilli, Vulgarij, Hieronymi, Cypriani, Ambrosij, Hilarij, Augustini, una cum Annotationibus, quae lectorem doceant, quid qua ratione mutatum sit.

This title, especially words: Novum Instrumentum ... Recognitum et Emendatum, means New Testament... Revised and Improved. This title must refer to the Latin text of the Vulgate, not to any Greek text, because at that time there was not a printed edition of the Greek New Testament in circulation. In his dedication to Pope Leo X, Erasmus says:

I perceived that that teaching which is our salvation was to be had in a much purer and more lively form if sought at the fountain-head and drawn from the actual sources than from pools and runnels. And so I have revised the whole New Testament (as they call it) against the standard of the Greek original... I have added annotations of my own, in order in the first place to show the reader what changes I have made, and why; second, to disentangle and explain anything that may be complicated, ambiguous, or obscure. 

It was a bilingual edition; the Greek text was in a left column, the Latin in a right. It is clear the Greek text was not the first target of this edition, it was the Latin text of the Vulgate.

Second edition 
The reception of the first edition was mixed, but within three years a second was made. The second edition used the more familiar term Testamentum instead of Instrumentum. In the second edition (1519) Erasmus also used Minuscule 3 (entire NT except Revelation; 12th century). The text was changed in about 400 places, with most—though not all—of the typographical errors corrected. Some new erroneous readings were added to the text. In this edition the text of Jerome's Vulgate Erasmus replaced by his own more elegant translation. The Latin translation had a good reception. After this edition, Erasmus was involved in many polemics and controversies. Particularly objectionable were the annotations from the universities of Cambridge and Oxford.

López de Zúñiga, known as Stunica, one of the editors of Ximenes' Complutensian Polyglot, reproached Erasmus that his text lacked part of the 1 John 5:7-8 (Comma Johanneum). Erasmus replied that he had not found it in any Greek manuscript. Stunica answered that Latin manuscripts are more reliable than Greek. In 1520 Edward Lee accused Erasmus of tendencies toward Arianism and Pelagianism, and of unorthodox sacramentology. Erasmus replied that he had not found any Greek manuscript that contained these words, he answered that this was a case not of omission, but simply of non-addition. He showed that even some Latin manuscripts did not contain these words.

Erasmus asked his friend, Paulus Bombasius, to check the Codex Vaticanus. Bombasius sent two extracts from this manuscript containing the beginnings of 1 John 4 and 5 (it did not include the Comma).

The second edition became the basis for Luther's German translation.

Third edition 
With the third edition of Erasmus's Greek text (1522) the Comma Johanneum was included. An often repeated story is that Erasmus included it, because he felt bound by a promise to include it if a manuscript was found that contained it. When a single 16th-century Greek manuscript subsequently had been found to contain it (Codex Montfortianus), Erasmus included it, though he expressed doubt as to the authenticity of the passage in his Annotations. This manuscript had probably been produced in 1520 by a Franciscan who translated it from the Vulgate. Henk Jan de Jonge, a specialist in Erasmian studies, stated that there is no explicit evidence that supports this frequently made assertion concerning a specific promise made by Erasmus. The real reason to include the Comma by Erasmus, was his care for his good name and for the success of his Novum Testamentum.

In this edition Erasmus, after using Codex Montfortianus, misprinted εμαις for εν αις in Apocalypse 2:13.

The third edition differed in 118 places from the second.

Oecolampadius and Gerbelius, Erasmus' subeditors, insisted that he introduce more readings from the minuscule 1 in the third edition. But according to Erasmus the text of this codex was altered from the Latin manuscripts, and had a secondary value.

This edition was used by William Tyndale for the first English New Testament (1526), by Robert Estienne as a base for his editions of the Greek New Testament from 1546 and 1549, and by the translators of the Geneva Bible and King James Version.

Fourth edition 

Shortly after the publication of his third edition, Erasmus had seen the Complutensian Polyglot, and used its text for improvement of his own text. In the Book of Revelation he altered his fourth edition (1527) in about 90 passages on the basis of the Complutensian text. Unfortunately Erasmus had forgotten what places of the Apocalypse he translated from Latin and he did not correct all of them. Except in the Revelation, the fourth edition differed only in about 20 places from his third (according to Mill about 10 places). The fourth edition was printed in three parallel columns, they contain the Greek, Erasmus' own Latin version, and the Vulgate.

In November 1533, before the appearance of the fifth edition, Sepúlveda sent Erasmus a description of the ancient Vatican manuscript, informing him that it differed from the text which he had edited in favour of the Vulgate in 365 places. Nothing is known about these 365 readings except for one. Erasmus in Adnotationes to Acts 27:16 wrote that according to the Codex from the Library Pontifici (i.e. Codex Vaticanus) name of the island is καυδα (Cauda), not κλαυδα (Clauda) as in his Novum Testamentum (Tamet si quidam admonent in codice Graeco pontificiae bibliothecae scriptum haberi, καυδα, id est, cauda). In another letter sent to Erasmus in 1534 Sepúlveda informed him, that Greek manuscripts were altered from the Vulgate.

Final edition 
The fifth edition of Erasmus, published in 1535, the year before his death, discarded the Vulgate. According to Mill the fifth edition differed only in four places from the fourth.

Editions four and five were not so important as the third edition in the history of the Text of the New Testament.

Popular demand for Greek New Testaments led to a flurry of further authorized and unauthorized editions in the early sixteenth century; almost all of which were based on Erasmus's work and incorporated his particular readings, although typically also making a number of minor changes of their own. Tregelles gives Acts 13:33 as an example of the places in which commonly received text did not follow Erasmian text (εν τω ψαλμω τω πρωτω → εν τω ψαλμω τω δευτερω).

See also 

 Complutensian Polyglot Bible
 Editio Regia
 Textus Receptus

Notes

References

Further reading 
 W. L. Adye, The History of the Printed Greek Text of the New Testament, Southampton 1865
 William W. Combs, Erasmus and the textus receptus, DBSJ 1 (Spring 1996): 35-53.
 Johann Jakob Griesbach, Novum Testamentum Graece (London, 1809), Prolegomena, p. XVII ff.
 
 Henk Jan de Jonge, Erasmus und die Glossa Ordinaria zum Neuen Testament, Nederlands Archief voor Kerkgeschiedenis 56 (1975), p. 51-77.
 Henk Jan de Jonge, Erasmus and the Comma Johanneum, Ephemerides Theologicae Lovanienses LXVI (1980), pp. 381–389

External links 
 R. Waltz, The Textus Receptus, Encyclopedia of Textual Criticism
 Martin Arhelger, Die Textgrundlage des Neues Testaments, 2008 
Scanned Copies
 Novum Instrumentum omne, 1st edition, Basel, 1516. 
 Novum Testamentum omne, 2nd edition, Basel, 1519.

Greek New Testament
Early printed Bibles
New Testament editions